van der Louw is a surname. Notable people with the surname include:

André van der Louw (1933–2005), Dutch politician
Hans van der Louw (born 1958), Dutch general

Surnames of Dutch origin